Surigao del Norte's 2nd congressional district is one of the two congressional districts of the Philippines in the province of Surigao del Norte. It has been represented in the House of Representatives since 1987. The district comprises all twelve local government units in mainland Surigao del Norte including its capital Surigao City. Its municipalities are Alegria, Bacuag, Claver, Gigaquit, Mainit, Malimono, Placer, San Francisco, Sison, Tagana-an and Tubod. It is currently represented in the 18th Congress by Ace Barbers of the Nacionalista Party (NP).

Representation history

Election results

2019

2016

2013

2010

See also
Legislative districts of Surigao del Norte

References

Congressional districts of the Philippines
Politics of Surigao del Norte
1987 establishments in the Philippines
Congressional districts of Caraga
Constituencies established in 1987